Charles Byron Renfrew (October 31, 1928 – December 14, 2017) was a United States district judge of the United States District Court for the Northern District of California.

Education and career
Renfrew was born in Detroit, Michigan. He enlisted in the United States Navy after high school in the aftermath of World War II, from 1946 to 1948. He then received an Artium Baccalaureus degree from Princeton University in 1952. He served in the United States Army from 1952 to 1953 and became a first lieutenant. He was a forward observer in Korea during the Korean War. He received a Juris Doctor from the University of Michigan Law School in 1956, thereafter entering private practice in San Francisco, California, from 1956 to 1972.

Federal Judicial Service

On November 29, 1971, Renfrew was nominated by President Richard Nixon to a seat on the United States District Court for the Northern District of California vacated by Judge Gerald Sanford Levin. Renfrew was confirmed by the United States Senate on December 2, 1971, and received his commission on December 9, 1971. Renfrew served in that capacity until his resignation on February 27, 1980.

Post Judicial Service

Following his resignation from the federal bench, he served as United States Deputy Attorney General until 1981. Renfrew was thereafter in private practice in San Francisco from 1981 to 1982. He was a vice president and counsel of the Chevron Corporation in San Francisco from 1983 to 1993. He returned to private practice in San Francisco in 1994. In 2013, he was listed as a NAFTA adjudicator. He died of heart failure on December 14, 2017.

References

Sources

External links

1928 births
2017 deaths
Lawyers from San Francisco
Lawyers from Detroit
Military personnel from Michigan
United States Deputy Attorneys General
Judges of the United States District Court for the Northern District of California
United States district court judges appointed by Richard Nixon
20th-century American judges
United States Navy sailors
Princeton University alumni
University of Michigan Law School alumni
United States Army officers
United States Army personnel of the Korean War